"Last Romance" is a song by Australian singer songwriter Mark Holden. It was released in November 1976 as the third and final single from Holden's second studio album, Let Me Love You (1976). The song was a commercial success peaking at number 11 on the Kent Music Report.

Track listing
7"/ Cassette (EMI 11304)
Side A
 "Last Romance" - 2:50

Side B
 "Hurricane Rider" - 3:37

Charts

Weekly charts

Year-end charts

References

1976 songs
Mark Holden songs
1976 singles
Pop ballads